Puthiya Bruce Lee is a 2018 Indian Tamil language action drama film written and directed by Mulaiyur A. Sonai on his directorial debut. The film stars a Bruce Lee look-alike actor named Bruce in his acting debut with another newcomer Raziya and Ashwanth Thilak. The film is considered as a Bruceploitation as it had the Lee imitator in the lead role who involved in martial arts related fight scenes for the film. The movie is centered on the legacy of Lee's style of actions.

Plot 
Bruce (himself) lives in a village area close to the mountain ranges with his mother. He acts as a single warrior when it comes to dealing with the crisis and other issues that his village faces, and he single-handedly manages to rescue his village from threats. Most of the people in the village also seek Bruce for assistance when they face problematic situations. On one day, his mother died from a fire accident which happened in his hut where he lived with his mother while his uncle Thennavan Duraisamy takes Bruce along with him to the Madurai city since his mother's death. But the village people request Thennavan Duraisamy to send back Bruce again to their village to safeguard them. On the other hand, Bruce's uncle faces some troubles over selling his real estate property to his friend due to the interruptions of a business person. The entire story revolves around the young man Bruce who comes from a village to the city in order to fight out for his uncle with his fighting skills to solve his uncle's problem over the property.

Cast 

 Bruce John
 Raziya
 Ashwanth Thilak as Thilak
 Suresh Narang

Production 
The filming process of the film started in 2013 and underwent production delays before its release on 25 May 2018. The director of the film, A. Sonai, who has assisted several film directors, made his maiden directorial venture by bringing back the memories of late veteran martial artist and actor Bruce Lee with the title Puthiya Bruce Lee. The film's director Sonai revealed that the Bruce Lee look-alike Chennai based boy Bruce would play the prominent role and told that Bruce John has also trained in martial arts and holds double blackbelt in Karate. Sonai also mentioned that the plot of the film is incorporated on Bruce Lee's two main important facets of life such as discipline and courage. The team also hired Suresh Narang as the antagonist for the film, who made his acting debut.

References 

2018 directorial debut films
Indian action drama films
2010s Tamil-language films
2018 action drama films
Indian martial arts films
2018 martial arts films
Bruceploitation films